Libero is a political youth magazine published in Helsinki, Finland. The magazine targets left-wing youth in the country and has been in circulation since 1945.

History and profile
The magazine was started in 1945 under the name Terä. It was published under this title until 1981 and was renamed Uusi valta in 1982. In 1987 the magazine changed its title to Libero. It is published quarterly. Its target audience is left-wing youth. In fact, it is the official magazine of the Left Youth of Finland (Finnish: Vasemmistonuoret). As of 2022 Joonas Pulkkinen is the editor-in-chief of the magazine.

See also
List of magazines in Finland

References

External links
 

1945 establishments in Finland
Finnish-language magazines
Magazines established in 1945
Magazines published in Helsinki
Political magazines published in Finland
Quarterly magazines published in Finland
Socialist magazines
Youth magazines